Alpha in comics may refer to:

Alpha (DC Comics), a character from DC Comics
Alpha (Marvel Comics), a character from Marvel Comics
Alpha (Lombard), a Franco-Belgian comics series
Alpha Girl, a 2012 Image Comics comic book series by Jean-Paul Bonjour and Jeff Roenning
Alpha the Ultimate Mutant, a character featured in Marvel Comics
Alpha (The Walking Dead), an antagonist in  the Walking Dead comic series